Ottley is an English surname. Notable people with this surname include the following:

Adam Ottley (1653–1723), English Anglican bishop
Alice Ottley (1840–1912), English educator
Charles Ottley (1858–1932), English naval officer
David Ottley (born 1955), English javelin thrower
David Ottley (cricketer) (born 1944), English cricketer
Doug Ottley (1923–1983), New Zealand footballer
Francis Ottley (1600 or 1601–1649), English politician and soldier
Jerold Ottley (1934–2021), American choirmaster
Kjorn Ottley (born 1989), Trinidadian cricketer
Richard Ottley (1626–1670), English politician
Richard Ottley (judge) ( 1827–1833), British colonial administrator
Robert Lawrence Ottley (1856–1933), English theologian
Roi Ottley (1906–1960), American writer and journalist
Ryan Ottley (born 1975), American comic book artist
William Young Ottley (1771–1836), English art collector
Yannick Ottley (born 1991), Trinidadian cricketer

English-language surnames